Bruiseology is the second and final studio album by new wave band the Waitresses, released by Polydor Records in 1983. The album was recorded amidst personnel conflict and the band disbanded a year later.

Track listing
All songs written by Chris Butler and Waitresses, except where noted.
 "A Girl's Gotta Do"
 "Make the Weather"
 "Everything's Wrong If My Hair Is Wrong"
 "Luxury"
 "Open City"
 "Thinking About Sex Again"
 "Bruiseology"
 "Pleasure" (Waitresses)
 "Spin"
 "They're All Out of Liquor, Let's Find Another Party"

Personnel
Patty Donahue – vocals
Chris Butler – guitar
Dan Klayman – organ
Tracy Wormworth – bass, vocals, lead vocal on "Spin"
Billy Ficca – drums
Mars Williams – saxophone
with:
Ed Caraeff – art direction, photography

Charts

References

1983 albums
The Waitresses albums
Albums produced by Hugh Padgham
Polydor Records albums